Laura Nurmsalu (born 1 June 1994) is an Estonian recurve archer who competed at the 2016 Summer Olympics.

Nurmsalu represented her country at the 2015 European Games in Baku, Azerbaijan. She competed in the individual recurve event and the team recurve event at the 2015 World Archery Championships in Copenhagen. 

Nurmsalu made her Olympic debut in 2016, where she was eliminated in the second round of the women's individual event. In 2019 Nurmsalu contested the European Games in Minsk, finishing the ranking round of the women's individual recurve competition in twenty-seventh place.

References

External links
 

Estonian female archers
Living people
Place of birth missing (living people)
1994 births
Archers at the 2015 European Games
European Games competitors for Estonia
Olympic archers of Estonia
Archers at the 2016 Summer Olympics
Archers at the 2019 European Games
21st-century Estonian women